Cuapetes is a genus of shrimp in the family Palaemonidae, first described by Austin Hobart Clark in 1919.  WoRMS accepts the following species:

Cuapetes agag (Kemp, 1922)
Cuapetes akiensis (Kubo, 1936)
Cuapetes americanus (Kingsley, 1878)
Cuapetes amymone (De Man, 1902)
Cuapetes anacanthus (Bruce, 1988)
Cuapetes andamanensis (Kemp, 1922)
Cuapetes calmani (Tattersall, 1921)
Cuapetes darwiniensis (Bruce, 1987)
Cuapetes demani (Kemp, 1915)
Cuapetes edwardsii (Paul'son, 1875)
Cuapetes elegans (Paul'son, 1875)
Cuapetes ensifrons (Dana, 1852)
Cuapetes grandis (Stimpson, 1860)
Cuapetes johnsoni (Bruce, 1987)
Cuapetes kororensis (Bruce, 1977)
Cuapetes lacertae (Bruce, 1992)
Cuapetes lanceolatus Okuno & Chan, 2012
Cuapetes longirostris (Borradaile, 1915)
Cuapetes nilandensis (Borradaile, 1915)
Cuapetes paulsoni (Bruce, 2003)
Cuapetes platycheles (Holthuis, 1952)
Cuapetes rapanui (Fransen, 1987)
Cuapetes seychellensis (Borradaile, 1915)
Cuapetes suvadivensis (Borradaile, 1915)
Cuapetes takedai Okuno, 2012
Cuapetes tenuipes (Borradaile, 1898)
Cuapetes uncinatus Bruce, 2012
Cuapetes ungujaensis (Bruce, 1969)
Cuapetes yapiensis Bruce, 2013

References

Palaemonoidea
Taxa named by Austin Hobart Clark